Dmitry Bulankin is a two times Russian ice speedway world champion.  

Bulankin won the Individual Ice Speedway World Championship title in 2004 and the Team Ice Racing World Championship titles with Russia in 2010.

References

1978 births
Living people
Russian speedway riders
Ice Speedway World Champions
Sportspeople from Penza